The Panamerican youth records in Olympic weightlifting are maintained in each weight class for the snatch lift, clean & jerk lift, and the total for both lifts by the Pan American Weightlifting Federation (PAWF).

Men
Key to tables:

Women

References
General
Pan American Youth Records 
Specific

External links
PAWF website

Panamerican, youth
Weightlifting in North America
Weightlifting in South America
Weightlifting youth